Ann-Margret Olsson (born April 28, 1941) is a Swedish-American actress, singer, and dancer. As an actress and singer, she is credited as Ann-Margret. 

She is known for her roles in Pocketful of Miracles (1961), State Fair (1962), Bye Bye Birdie (1963), Viva Las Vegas (1964), The Cincinnati Kid (1965), Carnal Knowledge (1971), The Train Robbers (1973), Tommy (1975), Magic (1978), The Villain (1979), The Return of the Soldier (1982), Who Will Love My Children? (1983), 52 Pick-Up (1986), Newsies (1992), Grumpy Old Men (1993), Grumpier Old Men (1995), Any Given Sunday (1999), Taxi (2004), The Break-Up (2006) and Going in Style (2017). She has won five Golden Globe Awards and been nominated for two Academy Awards, two Grammy Awards, a Screen Actors Guild Award, and six Emmy Awards. In 2010, she won an Emmy for her guest appearance on Law & Order: Special Victims Unit.

Her singing and acting careers span six decades, starting in 1961. Initially, she was billed as a female version of Elvis Presley. She has a sultry, vibrant contralto voice. She had a Top 20 hit song in 1961 and a charting album in 1964, and she scored a disco hit in 1979. She recorded a critically acclaimed gospel album in 2001 and an album of Christmas songs in 2004.

Early life  

Ann-Margret Olsson was born in Valsjöbyn, Jämtland County, Sweden, the daughter of Anna Regina and Carl Gustav Olsson, a native of Örnsköldsvik. She described Valsjöbyn as a small town of "lumberjacks and farmers high up near the Arctic Circle". Her father had immigrated to the USA but returned to Sweden in 1937 and married Anna Aronsson. After Ann-Margret's birth, Gustav wanted to emigrate again with the family. His wife hesitated and Gustav emigrated alone but was joined by his wife and daughter in 1946. Ann-Margaret has been a U.S. citizen since 1949. 

Ann-Margret took her first dance lessons at the Marjorie Young School of Dance, showing natural ability from the start, easily mimicking all the steps. Her parents were supportive, and her mother made all of her costumes by hand. To support the family, Ann-Margret's mother became a funeral parlor receptionist after her husband suffered a severe injury on his job. While a teenager, Ann-Margret appeared on the Morris B. Sachs Amateur Hour, Don McNeill's Breakfast Club, and Ted Mack's Amateur Hour.

She attended New Trier High School in Winnetka, Illinois, and continued to star in theater.

She was part of a group known as the Suttletones, which went to the Dunes in Las Vegas, which also headlined Tony Bennett and Al Hirt at that time. George Burns heard of her performance, and she auditioned for his annual holiday show, in which she and Burns performed a softshoe routine. Variety proclaimed that "George Burns has a gold mine in Ann-Margret ... she has a definite style of her own, which can easily guide her to star status".

Career

Music  

Ann-Margret began recording for RCA Victor in 1961. Her first RCA Victor recording was "Lost Love". Her debut album, And Here She Is: Ann-Margret, was recorded in Hollywood, arranged and conducted by Marty Paich. Later albums were produced in Nashville with Chet Atkins on guitar, the Jordanaires (Elvis Presley's backup singers), and the Anita Kerr Singers, with liner notes by mentor George Burns. She had a sexy, throaty contralto singing voice, and RCA Victor attempted to capitalize on the 'female Elvis' comparison by having her record a version of "Heartbreak Hotel" and other songs stylistically similar to Presley's. She scored the minor success "I Just Don't Understand" (from her second LP), which entered the Billboard Top 40 in the third week of August 1961 and stayed six weeks, peaking at number 17. The song was later performed by The Beatles and was recorded during a live performance at the BBC (recorded on July 16, 1963, and broadcast on August 20, 1963). Her only charting album was Beauty and the Beard (1964), on which she was accompanied by trumpeter Al Hirt. Ann-Margret appeared on The Jack Benny Program in 1961 (season 11, episode 24). She also sang at the Academy Awards presentation in 1962, singing the Oscar-nominated song "Theme from Bachelor in Paradise." Her contract with RCA Victor ended in 1966.

In 1962, Ann-Margret was nominated for a Grammy Award for Best New Artist.

In the late 1970s and early 1980s, she had hits on the dance charts, the most successful being 1979's "Love Rush," which peaked at number eight on the disco/dance charts.

In 2001, working with Art Greenhaw, she recorded the album God Is Love: The Gospel Sessions. The album went on to earn a Grammy nomination (forty years since her first) and also a Dove Award nomination for best album of the year in a gospel category. Her album Ann-Margret's Christmas Carol Collection, also produced and arranged by Greenhaw, was recorded in 2004.

Acting

1960s 

In 1961, she filmed a screen test at 20th Century Fox and was signed to a seven-year contract. Ann-Margret made her film debut in a loan-out to United Artists in Pocketful of Miracles with Bette Davis. It was a remake of the 1933 movie Lady for a Day. Both versions were directed by Frank Capra.

Then came a 1962 remake of Rodgers and Hammerstein's musical State Fair, in which she played the "bad girl" role of Emily opposite Bobby Darin and Pat Boone. She had previously tested for the part of Margie, the "good girl", but she seemed to be too seductive for that role according to the studio bosses, who then decided to make the switch. The two roles represented two sides of her real-life personalityshy and reserved offstage, but wildly exuberant and sensuous onstage. In her autobiography, the actress wrote that she changed "from Little Miss Lollipop to Sexpot-Banshee" once the music began. One critic argued "she wasn’t that well cast as a bad girl. Because she had so much energy and shape, producers thought she was; but she was more effective in parts closer to what she was in real life: an energetic good girl with a twinkle in the eye. 

Her next starring role, as the all-American teenager Kim from Sweet Apple, Ohio, in Bye Bye Birdie (1963), made her a major star. The premiere at Radio City Music Hall, 16years after her first visit to the famed theater, was the highest first-week grossing film to date at the Music Hall. Life magazine put her on the cover for the second time and announced that the "torrid dancing almost replaces the central heating in the theater." She was then asked to sing "Baby Won't You Please Come Home" at President John F. Kennedy's private birthday party at the Waldorf Astoria New York, one year after Marilyn Monroe's famous "Happy Birthday".

Ann-Margret met Elvis Presley on the MGM soundstage when the two filmed Viva Las Vegas (1964). Filmink argued "She had so much energy and pep that she had blown her previous three male co-stars off screen, but Elvis could match her. He was the best on-screen partner she ever had, and she was his." She recorded three duets with Presley for the film: "The Lady Loves Me", "You're The Boss", and "Today, Tomorrow, and Forever"; only "The Lady Loves Me" made it into the final film and none of them were commercially released until years after Presley's death, due to concerns by Colonel Tom Parker that Ann-Margret's presence threatened to overshadow Elvis. Ann-Margret introduced Presley to David Winters, whom she recommended as a choreographer for their film. Viva Las Vegas was Winters' first feature film choreography job and was his first of four movies with Presley, and his first of five films, including Kitten with a Whip (1964), Bus Riley's Back in Town (1965), Made in Paris (1966), and The Swinger (1966), and two TV specials with Ann-Margret. Winters was nominated for the 1970 Emmy Award for Outstanding Achievement in Choreography for his CBS Television Special: Ann-Margret: From Hollywood with Love (1969).

In 1963, Ann-Margret guest-starred in a popular episode of the animated TV series The Flintstones, voicing Ann-Margrock, an animated version of herself. She sang the ballad "The Littlest Lamb" as a lullaby and the (literally) rocking song, "Ain't Gonna Be a Fool". Decades later, she recorded the theme song, a modified version of the Viva Las Vegas theme, to the live-action film The Flintstones in Viva Rock Vegas.

While she was working on the film Once a Thief (1965), she met her future husband Roger Smith, who after his successful run on the private-eye television series Sunset Strip, was performing a live club show at the Hungry i on a bill with Bill Cosby and Don Adams. That meeting began their courtship, which was met with resistance from her parents.

Ann-Margret starred in The Cincinnati Kid in 1965 opposite Steve McQueen which was her first hit after four flops in a row. She also co-starred along with her friend Dean Martin in the spy spoof Murderers' Row (1966). Finally, she starred as the lead character in The Swinger in 1966 with Tony Franciosa. One critic argued "his film, a vehicle geared entirely around Ann-Margret’s talents, came close to killing her Hollywood career more than any other by virtue of its sheer incompetence."

Her red hair color (she is a "natural brunette") was the idea of Sydney Guilaroff, a hairdresser who changed the hair color of other famous actresses such as Lucille Ball.

She was offered the title role in Cat Ballou (1965), but her manager turned it down without telling her. In March 1966, Ann-Margret and entertainers Chuck Day and Mickey Jones teamed up for a USO tour to entertain United States servicemen in remote parts of Vietnam and other parts of South-East Asia. Ann-Margret, Day, and Jones reunited in November 2005 for an encore of this tour for veterans and troops at Nellis Air Force Base, Nevada.

During a lull in her film career in July 1967, Ann-Margret gave her first live performance in Las Vegas, with her husband Roger Smith (whom she had married in 1967) taking over as her manager after that engagement. Elvis Presley and his entourage came to see her during the show's five-week run and celebrate backstage. According to Ann-Margret's autobiography, Presley sent her a guitar-shaped floral arrangement for each of her Vegas openings. After the first Vegas run ended, she followed with a CBS television special The Ann-Margret Show, produced and directed by David Winters on December 1, 1968, with guest-stars Bob Hope, Jack Benny, Danny Thomas, and Carol Burnett. Then, she returned to Saigon as part of Hope's Christmas show. A second CBS television special followed, Ann-Margret: From Hollywood With Love, directed and choreographed by David Winters and produced and distributed by Winters' company Winters-Rosen, with guest-stars Dean Martin and Lucille Ball. David Winters and the show were nominated for a Primetime Emmy in Outstanding Choreography.

1970s 

In 1970, she returned to films with R. P. M., where she starred alongside Anthony Quinn, and C.C. and Company with Joe Namath as a biker and she portraying a fashion journalist.

In 1971, she starred in Carnal Knowledge by director Mike Nichols, playing the girlfriend of a neglectful, arguably abusive character played by Jack Nicholson. She was nominated for the Academy Award for Best Supporting Actress, and won the Golden Globe Award for Best Supporting Actress. Filmink argued this amounted to a comeback "in a way... because she he never really regained her former status as an above-the-title star of feature films – her follow-up movies were “girl” parts... The seventies were tough times for female stars who were not Barbra Streisand."

On the set of The Train Robbers in Durango, Mexico, in June 1972, she told Nancy Anderson of Copley News Service that she had been on the "grapefruit diet" and had lost almost 20 pounds (134 to 115) eating unsweetened citrus.

On Sunday, September 10, 1972, while performing at Lake Tahoe, she fell  from an elevated platform to the stage and suffered injuries including a broken left arm, cheekbone, and jawbone. She required meticulous facial reconstructive surgery that required wiring her mouth shut and putting her on a liquid diet. Unable to work for ten weeks, she returned to the stage almost back to normal.

For her contributions to the film industry, Ann-Margret received a motion pictures star on the Hollywood Walk of Fame in 1973. Her star is located at 6501 Hollywood Boulevard.

Throughout the 1970s, Ann-Margret balanced her live musical performances with a string of dramatic film roles that played against her glamorous image. In 1973, she starred with John Wayne in The Train Robbers. Then came the musical Tommy in 1975, for which she was again nominated for an Academy Award for Best Actress. In addition, she has been nominated for ten Golden Globe Awards, winning five, including her Best ActressMotion Picture Comedy or Musical for Tommy. 
On August 17, 1977, Ann-Margret and Roger Smith traveled to Memphis to attend Elvis Presley's funeral. Three months later, she hosted Memories of Elvis featuring abridged versions of the Elvis 1968 TV and Aloha from Hawaii specials.

Other notable films she co-starred in during the late 1970s include Joseph Andrews (1977), The Last Remake of Beau Geste (1977), the horror/suspense thriller Magic (1978) with Anthony Hopkins, and she had a cameo role in The Cheap Detective (1978).

Ann-Margret was an early choice of Allan Carr's to play the role of Sandy Dumbrowski in the 1978 film Grease. At 37 years old, she was ultimately determined to be too old to convincingly play the role of a high school student. Olivia Newton-John got the role instead, and the character was renamed "Sandy Olsson" (after Ann-Margret's birth surname) in her honor.

1980s  

Ann-Margret starred opposite Bruce Dern in Middle Age Crazy (1980). In 1982, she co-starred with Walter Matthau and Dinah Manoff in the film version of Neil Simon's play I Ought to Be in Pictures. That same year also saw the release of Lookin' to Get Out, filmed two years prior in 1980, in which she co-starred with Jon Voight and played the mother of a five-year-old Angelina Jolie in Jolie's screen debut. To round out 1982, she appeared alongside Alan Bates, Glenda Jackson, and Julie Christie in the film adaptation of The Return of the Soldier. She also starred in the TV movies Who Will Love My Children? (1983) and a remake of A Streetcar Named Desire (1984), winning Golden Globe Awards for both performances.

After Barbara Stanwyck won the Primetime Emmy Award for Outstanding Lead Actress in a Limited Series or Movie in 1983 for her role in The Thorn Birds, she mentioned Ann-Margret's performance in Who Will Love My Children?, stating at the podium "I would like to pay a personal tribute at this time to a lady who is a wonderful entertainer... I think she gave one of the finest, most beautiful performances I have ever seen...Ann-Margret, you were superb."

In Twice in a Lifetime Ann-Margret portrayed the woman for whom Gene Hackman's character left his wife. The next year she appeared as the wife of Roy Scheider's character in the crime thriller 52 Pick-Up. In 1987 she co-starred with Elizabeth Ashley (and also with Claudette Colbert, in the last on-screen role of the film legend's career) in the NBC two-part series "The Two Mrs. Grenvilles". It earned Ann-Margret another Emmy Award nomination, this time for Outstanding Lead Actress in a Mini Series or a Special.

In 1989, an illustration of Oprah Winfrey appeared on the cover of TV Guide, and although the head was Oprah's, the body was from a 1979 publicity shot of Ann-Margret. The illustration was rendered so tightly in color pencil by freelance artist Chris Notarile that most people thought it was a composite photograph.

1990s and 2000s 

In 1991, she starred in the TV film Our Sons opposite Julie Andrews as mothers of sons who are lovers, one of whom is dying of AIDS. In 1992, she co-starred with Robert Duvall and Christian Bale in the Disney musical Newsies. In 1993, Ann-Margret starred in the hit comedy Grumpy Old Men reuniting with Matthau and Jack Lemmon. Her character returned for Grumpier Old Men (1995), the equally successful sequel which this time co-starred Sophia Loren.

Ann-Margret published an autobiography in 1994 titled Ann-Margret: My Story, in which she publicly acknowledged her battle with and ongoing recovery from alcoholism. She played Belle Watling in Scarlett (1994), a television miniseries loosely based on the 1991 book of the same name written by Alexandra Ripley as a sequel to Margaret Mitchell's 1936 novel Gone with the Wind. In 1995, she was chosen by Empire magazine as one of the 100 Sexiest Stars in film history; she ranked 10th.

She also filmed Any Given Sunday (1999) for director Oliver Stone, portraying the mother of football team owner Cameron Diaz. She filmed a cameo appearance for The Limey with Tommy Peacock, but her performance was cut from the movie.

Ann-Margret also starred in several television films, including Queen: The Story of an American Family (1993), Following Her Heart (1994), and Life of the Party (1999), the latter of which she received nominations for an Emmy Award, a Golden Globe Award, and a Screen Actors Guild Award.

She made guest appearances on the television show Touched by an Angel in 2000 and three episodes of Third Watch in 2003. In 2001, she made her first appearance in a stage musical, playing the character of brothel owner Mona Stangley in a new touring production of The Best Little Whorehouse in Texas. The production co-starred Gary Sandy and Ed Dixon. She played Jimmy Fallon's mother in the 2004 comedy Taxi, co-starring Queen Latifah. In 2001, Ann-Margret worked with Art Greenhaw on the album God Is Love: The Gospel Sessions. The project resulted in her second Grammy Award nomination and first Dove Award nomination for Best Album of the Year in a Gospel category. They teamed up again in 2004 for the album Ann-Margret's Christmas Carol Collection. She performed material from the album at two auditorium church services at Crystal Cathedral in Garden Grove, California, and broadcast worldwide on the program Hour of Power.

In 2006, Ann-Margret had supporting roles in the box-office hits The Break-Up with Jennifer Aniston and Vince Vaughn, and The Santa Clause 3 with Tim Allen. She also starred in several independent films, such as Memory (2006) with Billy Zane and Dennis Hopper. In 2009, she appeared in the comedy Old Dogs with John Travolta and Robin Williams.

2010–present  

Ann-Margret guest-starred in an episode of Law & Order: Special Victims Unit, "Bedtime", which first aired on March31, 2010, on NBC. She received her sixth Emmy nomination for her performance. She also appeared in the Lifetime series, Army Wives, in the episode "Guns and Roses" (season four, episode five), which originally aired May9, 2010. On August 29, 2010, she won an Emmy Award for Guest Performance by an Actress for her SVU performance. It was the first Emmy win of her career, and she received a standing ovation from the Emmy venue audience as she approached the stage to receive her award.

On October 14, 2010, Ann-Margret appeared on CBS' CSI.

In the Fall of 2011, she co-starred with Andy Williams for a series of concerts at his Moon River Theater in Branson, Missouri. These proved to be Williams' last performances before his death in 2012.

In 2014, she began appearing in a recurring role in the Showtime original series Ray Donovan. On October 1, 2018, it was announced that she had joined the second season of the Syfy series Happy! in a recurring role.

In 2018, she guest-starred in The Kominsky Method, portraying Diane, a widow and possible love interest for the recently widowed Norman, played by Alan Arkin.

Personal life 

Ann-Margret is the stepmother of the three children of her husband Roger Smith, an actor who later became her manager. She and Smith were married for 50years from May8, 1967, until his death on June4, 2017. Before this, she dated Eddie Fisher and was romantically linked to Elvis Presley when they co-starred in the film Viva Las Vegas in 1964.

A keen motorcyclist, Ann-Margret rode a 500 cc Triumph T100C Tiger in The Swinger (1966) and used the same model, fitted with a nonstandard electric starter, in her stage show and her TV specials. She was featured in Triumph Motorcycles' official advertisements in the 1960s. She suffered three broken ribs and a fractured shoulder when she was thrown off a motorcycle in rural Minnesota in 2000.

In a 2012 interview, she stated, "All my life I've had this feeling, deep, deep, deep inside of me... my faith and my feelings.... I mean you go outside and you see flowers. You see the trees. You see all your loved ones, you see... and then you think of Who created it all."   She described her relationship with God, and with Jesus Christ as "something which is really important to me. If I thought that I would never see my mother and father again, I couldn't make it. I could not go a step further."

On May 14, 2022, she was awarded an honorary doctoral degree in Humane Letters by the University of Nevada, Las Vegas.

Portrayal 

The 2005 CBS miniseries Elvis includes the story of her affair with Elvis Presley during the filming of Viva Las Vegas. She was portrayed by the actress Rose McGowan. She also provided the voice of a fictionalized version of herself in The Flintstones 1963 episode "Ann-Margrock Presents".

Filmography

Film

Box office ranking  

For two years Ann-Margret was voted by movie exhibitors as being among the most popular actors in the United States:
 1964 – 8th
 1965 – 17th

Television

Discography

Singles

EPs  

 And Here She Is...Ann-Margret (1961)
 Side 1: "I Just Don't Understand"/"I Don't Hurt Anymore"
 Side 2: "Teach Me Tonight"/"Kansas City"
 More and More American Hits (compilation) (1962)
 Side 2: "What Am I Supposed To Do"

Albums  

 And Here She Is...Ann-Margret (1961)
 On the Way Up (1962)
 The Vivacious One (1962)
 Bachelor's Paradise (1963)
 Beauty and the Beard (1964) (with Al Hirt)
 David Merrick Presents Hits from His Broadway Hits (1964) (with David Merrick)
 Songs from "The Swinger" (And Other Swingin' Songs) (1966)
 The Cowboy and the Lady (1969) (with Lee Hazlewood)
 Ann-Margret (1979)
 God Is Love: The Gospel Sessions (2001)
 Today, Tomorrow and Forever: Box Set (2002) (with Elvis Presley)
 Ann-Margret's Christmas Carol Collection (2004)
 Love Rush (reissue of Ann-Margret) (2007)
 God is Love: The Gospel Sessions 2 (2011)
 Born to Be Wild (2023)

Soundtracks  

 State Fair (1962)
 Bye Bye Birdie (1963)
 The Pleasure Seekers (1965)
 Tommy (1975)
 Newsies (1992)
 The Flintstones in Viva Rock Vegas (2000)
 Viva Las Vegas (LP reissue of Viva Las Vegas EP) (2007) (with Elvis Presley)

Theatre productions
 Love Letters, with Burt Reynolds
 The Best Little Whorehouse in Texas (2001, touring production)

Orders  

  Commander of the Royal Order of the Polar Star (KNO) (December 2, 1988)

Awards and nominations

See also  

 List of dancers

References

Bibliography

External links  

General
 
 
 
 [ Ann-Margret] at AllMusic
 Ann of a Thousand Knights at Snopes
  at age 16 in 1957.

Interviews
 Interview with Larry King, January 1, 2001, has a segment on the 2001 touring production of The Best Little Whorehouse in Texas.

1941 births
Living people
20th Century Studios contract players
20th-century Swedish actresses
20th-century Swedish women singers
Actresses from Stockholm
Best Miniseries or Television Movie Actress Golden Globe winners
Best Musical or Comedy Actress Golden Globe (film) winners
Best Supporting Actress Golden Globe (film) winners
Commanders of the Order of the Polar Star
Gold Star Records artists
Las Vegas shows
MCA Records artists
New Star of the Year (Actress) Golden Globe winners
New Trier High School alumni
People from Jämtland
People from Wilmette, Illinois
Primetime Emmy Award winners
RCA Victor artists
Swedish emigrants to the United States
Swedish female dancers
Swedish film actresses
Swedish stage actresses
United Service Organizations entertainers